is a single released by Dir En Grey on January 20, 1999, simultaneously along with "Akuro no Oka" and "-Zan-". The single peaked at number 5 on the Oricon music charts in Japan.

The song was covered by R-Shitei on the compilation Crush! 2 -90's V-Rock Best Hit Cover Songs-, which was released on November 23, 2011 and features current visual kei bands covering songs from bands that were important to the 1990s visual kei movement.

Track listing

Personnel 
 Dir En Grey
 Kyo – vocals, lyricist
 Kaoru – guitar
 Die – guitar
 Toshiya – bass guitar
 Shinya – drums
 Yoshiki Hayashi – producer
 Joe Chiccarelli - audio mixing
 Steven Marcussen (Precision Mastering) – mastering
 Gary Adante, Rob Arbittier and Eddie DeLena (Noisy Neighbors Productions) – remixing

References 

1999 singles
Dir En Grey songs
Songs written by Kyo (musician)
1999 songs
East West Records singles